Tom Hunter (born 1965) is a London-based British artist working in photography and film. His photographs often reference and reimagine classical paintings. He was the first photographer to have a one-man show at the National Gallery, London.

Hunter has shown work internationally in exhibitions, his work is held in a number of public collections and he has had four books published. He has won various awards including an Honorary Fellowship of the Royal Photographic Society.

Life and work
Hunter was born in Bournemouth, UK. He studied at the London College of Printing and gained an MA from the Royal College of Art in London.

His work has specialised in documenting life in Hackney, depicting local issues and sensationalist news headlines with compositions borrowed from the Old Masters. For instance, his photograph of a squatter, Woman Reading a Possession Order, references Johannes Vermeer's Girl Reading a Letter at an Open Window. This photograph won the Kobal Photographic Portrait Award in 1998. Of the photograph, which was shot with a large-format camera and printed using the Ilfochrome process, Hunter said:

I just wanted to take a picture showing the dignity of squatter life – a piece of propaganda to save my neighbourhood....The great thing is, the picture got a dialogue going with the council – and we managed to save the houses.

While praising both the National Gallery exhibition as a whole and several of the photographs within it, Tim Adams criticized a staged photograph, comparing it unfavorably with the work of Richard Billingham or Graham Smith.

In 2010 Hunter screened A Palace for Us, a film he made about the elderly residents of public buildings in Woodberry Down, Manor House, London. Jonathan Jones described it as a 'magical' work of contemporary art that chronicled the postwar ambition to provide housing for the working class.

He works at the Photography and the Archive Research Centre in London.

In 2019 Hunter showed a series of photographs at Hastings Museum and Art Gallery, of taxi drivers from various other countries that had made Hastings their home, along with works from the museum's collection.

Books
Factory Built Homes: Holly Street Estate 1968-1998. Holly Street Public Arts Trust, 1998. .
Tom Hunter. Ostfildern, Germany: Hatje Cantz, 2003. . Edited by White Cube, texts by Michael Bracewell and Paul Shepheard, essays by Jean Wainwright.
Tom Hunter: Living in Hell and Other Stories. Newhaven, CT: Yale University Press; London: National Gallery, 2005. .
The Way Home. Ostfildern, Germany: Hatje Cantz, 2012. .
Le Crowbar. Stockport: Here Press, 2013. . Edition of 1000 copies.

Exhibitions
Living in Hell and Other Stories, National Gallery, London.
Tableaux Vivants, Kunsthalle, Vienna.
Composure, Susan Hobbs Gallery, Toronto.
Parallax, Sandronirey Gallery, California.
2007: group exhibition of work about the London borough of Hackney by eight artists.
A Journey Home, Hastings Museum and Art Gallery, Hastings, UK, February–June 2019.

Awards
1998: Kobal Photographic Portrait Award for Woman Reading a Possession Order.
2004: John Kobal Photographic Book Award 2003 for Tom Hunter.
2010: Honorary Fellowship of the Royal Photographic Society.

Collections
Hunter's work is held in the following public collections:
National Gallery, London
Museum of Modern Art
Smithsonian Institution
Victoria and Albert Museum
Moderna Museet
Los Angeles County Museum of Art

References

External links

1965 births
Living people
Photographers from Dorset
Artists from Bournemouth